Dawes' limit is a formula to express the maximum resolving power of a microscope or telescope.  It is so named after its discoverer, W. R. Dawes
, although it is also credited to Lord Rayleigh.

The formula takes different forms depending on the units.

See also
Rayleigh criterion

References

Optics